Carex sect. Macrocephalae is a section of the genus Carex, containing two species. Both are coastal species of sandy areas beside the northern Pacific Ocean – Carex kobomugi from Taiwan to northern China and Japan (and as an invasive species in the north-eastern United States), and Carex macrocephala from northern China to Oregon.

References

Carex
Plant sections